Ági Szalóki (born Budapest, October 17, 1978) is a Hungarian folk singer. She has toured worldwide with world music and folk revival bands such as Besh o droM and Ökrös.

Life
Szalóki started singing as a toddler, considering Márta Sebestyén a role model. Her musical background is traditional folk music; she first won recognition for singing with Ökrös in a traditional folk style, and Besh o droM, a Balkan gypsy brass band. With these ensembles she toured around the world from the Montreal Jazz Festival, through Glastonbury Festival to the Théatre de la Ville in Paris, from New York to Beijing.

In 2005, she began to pursue her solo career and explore various genres, such as jazz, thirties ballads, and children's songs.

Three of her six released albums have been awarded Album of the Year Prizes (MAHASZ Fonogram Award) in the children's records and jazz categories.

"When I sing it's not important whether it's jazz or traditional music or music of any other kind", Szalóki has said. "I feel as if I'm swimming in the music. The music is like water; or air and I fly in it."

She is trained in the Kodály method. Many of her projects are inspired by poetry, from "Sunset of Rust, It is Dusk" on Lament (2005), to the Karády album of ballads (A Vágy Muzsikál, 2008).

She has also performed at numerous children's concerts.

In 2015, she had hypothyroidism, but recovered.

Discography

Solo albums

 Téli-nyári laboda / Winter-Summer Orache FolkEurópa, 2004
Szalóki's first solo album was written for preschool children. The record contains nursery rhymes, tales, children's games and other songs. The musical accompaniment was composed by folk-inspired classical musicians.
Ági Szalóki – voice, Dávid Lamm – guitar, Vera Berán – cello, András Dés – kanna, drums, Kati Lázár – tale telling, Róbert 'Szigony' Kerényi – flute, Péter Bede – flute, István Berán – bombard, Zoltán Kovács – double bass, Judit Ábrahám – gardon.
 Hallgató / Lament FolkEurópa, 2005, Award "Fonogram", 2006 – Best Jazz Album of the year
These folk songs originate from Moldva and Gyimes.
Ági Szalóki – voice, József Balázs – piano, Dávid Lamm – guitar, Kristóf Bacsó – tenor saxophone, András Dés – percussion, József Barcza Horváth – double bass, bass.
 Cipity Lőrinc FolkEurópa, 2006, Award "Fonogram", 2007 – Best Album for Children
The CD largely consists of folk songs from Transylvania and the Uplands arranged by the band, together with poems by Ágnes Nagy Nemes and Sándor Weöres set to music. The poems are also narrated by two noted performers from the theatre, Mari Kiss and János Kulka.
Ági Szalóki – voice, Dávid Lamm – guitar, Judit Nagy – cello, András Dés – percussion Zoltán Kovács – double bass 
Featuring: József Balázs – piano, Balázs Szokolay Dongó – flute, bagpipe, Attila Jakab – violin, József Barcza Horváth – double bass, poems and tale telling: Mari Kiss and János Kulka
 A vágy muzsikál FolkEurópa, 2008
These songs speak about the happiness and the sadness of love.
Ági Szalóki – voice, Kristóf Bacsó – tenor saxophone, Ferenc Schrek – pozan, Gábor Juhász – guitar, Dávid Lamm – guitar, Zoltán Kovács – double bass, András Mohay – drums, Róbert Szakcsi Lakatos – piano, Richárd Szaniszló – vibrafon, Tcha Limberger – violin
 Gingalló FolkEurópa, 2009
The record includes renewed folksongs and sung poems from Attila József, Károly Tamkó Sirató, Sándor Weöres and from Anna Szabó T., who is a young Transylvanian-born poet. The narrator of the record who is telling the tales is the actor György Cserhalmi.
Ági Szalóki – voice, whistle; Dávid Lamm – guitar, voice; Zoltán Kovács – double bass, voice; András Dés – percussion, voice.
Featuring: Kornél Fekete-Kovács – horn, Gábor Juhász – guitar, Péter Szalai– tabla, Balázs Szokolay Dongó – flute, tárogató; tale telling György Cserhalmi
 Kishúg/ "Little Sister" FolkEurópa, 2010
This album combines Hungarian, Roma, and Turkish songs with contemporary Hungarian poetry.
Band members: Ági Szalóki – voice, Gergő Borlai – drums, Zsolt Csókás – guitar, Zoltán Kovács – double bass.
Featuring: Peta Lukács – guitar, Zoltán Sipeki – guitar, György Orbán – bass violin

Contribution

Korom Attila – Hajnali, PolyGram, 1997
Ökrös – Bonchida, háromszor, ABT, 1998
Kalotaszegi népzene – Neti Sanyi és Kicsi Aladár, ABT, 1999
Besh o droM – Macsó hímzés, Fonó Records, 2000
Triton – Indulj el, Bahia, 2001
Karácsonynak éjszakáján, Tom-Tom Records, 2001
Balkan Syndicate – Nikola, Tom-Tom Records, 2003
Makám – Anzix, FolkEurópa, 2003
Besh o droM – Gyí!, private release, 2004
Balázs Elemér Group – Hungarian Folksongs, X-Produkció, 2005
Balogh Kálmán – Karácsonyi örömzene, Gryllus, 2005
Amikor én még kissrác voltam – Tisztelgés az Illés zenekar előtt, Universal Music, 2005
Besh o droM – Once I Catch The Devil, private release, 2005
Tony Lakatos – Gipsy Colours, Skip Records, 2005
Kiss Feri – Love's Doors, Etnofon, 2005
V/A – Stars, Stars..., FolkEurópa, 2006
Ajándék – Roma művészek a gyerekekért, suliNova közoktatás-fejlesztési és Pedagógus-továbbképzési Kht./ suliNova Public Education Development and Teacher Training Company, 2006
Balogh Kálmán és a Gipsy Cimbalom Band – Aven Shavale, FolkEurópa, 2007
Oi Va Voi V2 Records International Ltd., 2007
Szabó Dániel – Egetverő TIM produkció Bt., 2007
Budapest Bár, EMI Zenei Kft., 2007
Szájról szájra / Mouth to mouth, FolkEurópa, 2007
Bognár Szilvia – Semmicske énekek, Gryllus Kiadó, 2008
Sárkány apó, Helikon Kiadó – Gryllus Kiadó, 2008
"volt egyszer volt egy kis zsidó", Gryllus Kiadó, 2008
Kozma Orsi Quartet – Hide And Seek, Magneoton, 2008
Hespèrion XXI - Bal·Kan: Honey and Blood, Alia Vox, 2013

Awards
Fonogram Prize (2006 – for Hallgató / Lament, 2007 – for Cipity Lőrinc, 2010 – for Gingalló)
2006 – Artisjus Artistic Prize
2006 – Andás Bozóki culture minister lauded Szalóki for her excellence artistic activities of children's songs and world music genres
2007 – Zoltán Kodály Memorial Prize
2009 – March Youths Award (State award)
2010 – Sanoma and Story Magazine Value Award

References

External links
 Ági Szalóki official website 
 Hangvető – Transmitting the treasure of Hungarian music
 Biography

1978 births
Living people
Musicians from Budapest
21st-century Hungarian women singers